Crepidium dentatum, the toothed Crepidium, is a species of plant in the family Orchidaceae, endemic to the Philippines.

Description

Taxonomy

Distribution and habitat

Ecology

References

dentatum
Orchids of the Philippines